Gerardo Ortiz (born October 5, 1989) is an American singer, songwriter and record producer in the Regional Mexican genre.

Discography 
Studio albums
 2010: Ni Hoy Ni Mañana
 2011: Entre Dios y El Diablo
 2012: El Primer Ministro
 2013: Archivos de Mi Vida
 2015: Hoy Más Fuerte
 2017: Comere Callado Vol. 1
 2018: Comere Callado Vol. 2
 2020: Más Caro, Que Ayer
2021: Décimo Aniversario
Live albums
 2009: En Vivo Las Tundras
 2011: Morir y Existir En Vivo
 2013: Sold Out – En Vivo Desde El Nokia Theatre LA Live

Awards and nominations

References 

1989 births
Living people
American musicians of Mexican descent
American banda musicians
American norteño musicians
Hispanic and Latino American musicians
Singers from California
Spanish-language singers of the United States
Sony Music Latin artists
Musicians from Pasadena, California
Latin music songwriters
21st-century American singers
Blair High School (Pasadena, California) alumni
Latin music record producers